Douglas A. Rediker is an American attorney and economist who is the founder and chairman of International Capital Strategies, LLC, a policy and markets advisory firm based in Washington, D.C. He is also a non-resident senior fellow at the Brookings Institution.

Education 
Rediker earned a Bachelor of Arts degree in political science from Vassar College and a Juris Doctor from the Fordham University School of Law.

Career 
Rediker began his career as an attorney with Skadden Arps in New York and Washington, D.C. He later worked as an investment banker and private equity investor for a number of investment banks, including Salomon Brothers, Merrill Lynch and Lehman Brothers. He was instrumental in leading a number of the earliest privatizations in Central and Eastern Europe. In particular, Rediker led many transactions involving the Hungarian Telecommunications Company, Magyar Telekom (previously known as Matav), including its initial public offering on the New York Stock Exchange. He was also a London-based partner in TD Capital, a private equity firm focused on media and telecommunications investments.

Rediker was a member of the National Finance Committee for the Barack Obama 2008 presidential campaign.

From 2012 through 2016, he was a visiting fellow at the Peterson Institute for International Economics. Until 2012, he was a member of the executive board of the International Monetary Fund representing the United States. He was nominated by President Barack Obama on December 2, 2009. His confirmation hearing before the United States Senate Committee on Foreign Relations was held on January 28, 2010 and he was confirmed by the United States Senate on March 10, 2010.

Previously, he spent several years as the co-founder and director of the New America Foundation's Global Strategic Finance Initiative ("GSFI").

He has written extensively and testified before Congress on the subject of state capitalism, global finance, Sovereign Wealth Funds and other issues surrounding the relationship between global capital flows and their impact on foreign policy.

Rediker has received numerous industry awards, including having been named an "Emerging Markets Superstar" by Global Finance and has received both the "EEMEA Equity" and "M&A Deals of the Year" by The International Financing Review. He is a member of the Council on Foreign Relations. Rediker appears often in both broadcast and print media, and has been published in The New Republic, The National Interest and The Wall Street Journal.

Personal life 
He and his wife, Heidi Crebo-Rediker, co-founded the GSFI in 2007 after they both returned to the United States following 16 years in Europe. Crebo-Rediker left GSFI to join the staff of the Senate Foreign Relations Committee in February 2009. She later served as the first chief Economist at the US State Department, focused on economic statecraft initiative of Hillary Clinton.

References 

Private equity and venture capital investors
Year of birth missing (living people)
Living people
Obama administration personnel
International Monetary Fund people
Vassar College alumni
New York (state) lawyers
Lawyers from Washington, D.C.
American investment bankers
Merrill (company) people
Lehman Brothers people
Chatham House people
Skadden, Arps, Slate, Meagher & Flom people
American officials of the United Nations